Jordy Leenaerts (born 24 August 1983), better known by the stage name Timecop1983, is a Dutch electronic musician from Eindhoven, producing music in the synthwave genre. His debut album, Childhood Memories, was released in 2014, followed by Journeys in the same year. The albums Reflections and Night Drive were released in 2015 and 2018, respectively. He explained in an interview that his stage name came about as a combination of Futurecop! and his year of birth.

Biography 
Leenaerts started making music at the age of 12 on his computer with a music tracker. Since the rise and popularity of synthesizer pop, a subgenre of new wave music, Leenaerts started in 2014 with his alias Timecop1983. He is producing his music with computers, software synthesizers and analog equipment. In an interview Leenaerts said he wants to create a nostalgic wistfulness with his music, reminiscent of the 1980s, combined with dream-pop elements and melancholic songwriting.

Timecop1983 got international recognition in 2016 with the label NewRetroWave. He is often asked to perform live in the United States and in Dubai. In 2016 he had a live show at the Amsterdam Dance Event with fellow-artists Sunglasses Kid, College and Maethelvin.

As a side project, in June 2016 Leenaerts released the Blade Runner inspired 2083 EP under the Division alias. The EP's Bandcamp page contains a reference to Timecop1983: "The year is 2083... Timecop1983 has gone over to the dark side... Introducing Division... From the nuclear wastelands of the future...".

His music and logo were in the video game Grand Theft Auto V. He wrote music for the game Crossing Souls that was released in 2018. His music can also be heard in the 2017 Netflix series Coin Heist and You Get Me. In 2018, Timecop1983 did a tour across fourteen American states. At the end of that same year, he had a large show with synthwave band The Midnight.

His music videos have had over 37 million views as of April 2021.

Discography

Timecop1983

Albums

 Childhood Memories (February 2014, Playmaker)
 Journeys (June 2014, self-released)
 Reflections (June 2015, Urban Road Records)
 Night Drive (2018, TimeSlave Recordings)
 Faded Touch (Feat. Josh Dally) (2021, self-released)

EPs

 Synthetic Romance (January 2014)
 Waves EP (September 2014)
 Lovers, EP - PART 1 (July 2016)
 Running in the Dark EP (November 2016)
 Lovers, EP- PART 2 (August 2017)
 Multiverse (September 2022)

Singles
 Tokyo Rose - Midnight Chase (Timecop1983 Remix) (2013)
 Lonely Nights (2013)
 Femmepop & Timecop1983 - Our Time (2014)
 Mercury (2014)
 Don't Let Go (feat. Dana Jean Phoenix) (2015)
 My Room - feat. Oscar (Lieutenant Jangles Soundtrack) (2018)
 Faded Memory (feat. Jessie Frye) (2018)
 My Delorean - (with Primo (aka Primo the Alien)) (2019)
 One Night (feat. Josh Dally) (2020)

Division

EPs
 2083 (2016)

References

External links
 Official website
 
 
 
 Interview with Timecop1983 on Vehlinggo
 Interview with Timecop1983 on Vice
Interview with Timecop1983 on Beyond Synth

1983 births
Dutch electronic musicians
Living people
Musicians from Eindhoven
Synthwave musicians